Hornell Municipal Airport  is a city-owned public-use airport located three nautical miles (6 km) north of the central business district of Hornell, a city in Steuben County, New York, United States. It is included in the National Plan of Integrated Airport Systems for 2011–2015, which categorized it as a general aviation airport.

Although most U.S. airports use the same three-letter location identifier for the FAA and IATA, this airport is assigned HTF by the FAA, but has no designation from the IATA (which assigned HTF to Hatfield Airport in the Hatfield, Hertfordshire, England).

Facilities and aircraft 
Hornell Municipal Airport covers an area of 54 acres (22 ha) at an elevation of 1,220 feet (372 m) above mean sea level. It has one runway designated 18/36 with an asphalt surface measuring 5,000 by 75 feet (1,524 x 23 m).

For the 12-month period ending September 4, 2009, the airport had 19,902 aircraft operations, an average of 54 per day: 90% general aviation and 10% air taxi. At that time there were 19 aircraft based at this airport: 89.5% single-engine, and 10.5% multi-engine.

References

External links 
 Airport page at City of Hornell website
  from New York State DOT Airport Directory
 Aerial image as of April 1994 from USGS The National Map
 
 

Airports in New York (state)
Transportation in Steuben County, New York
Hornell, New York